Col. Ahmed Ali Salaad was a Somali politician. He became Mayor of Galkayo (the capital of the Mudug region in north-central Somalia) on February 6, 2013, succeeding Saeed Abdi Farah in office.

References

Ethnic Somali people
Living people
Mayors of places in Somalia
Year of birth missing (living people)